Kolarica (also spelled Kolerica) is a former settlement in the Municipality of Krško in northeastern Slovenia. It is now part of the village of Slivje. The area is part of the traditional region of Lower Carniola. The municipality is now included in the Lower Sava Statistical Region.

Geography
Kolarica stands southeast of the village center of Slivje.

History
Kolarica was annexed by Slivje in 1953, ending its existence as an independent settlement.

References

External links
Kolarica at Geopedia

Populated places in the Municipality of Krško
Former settlements in Slovenia